This is a list of countries and dependencies with a permanent population that have no legal political parties. Some have opposition groups that operate clandestinely.

Monarchies
 – Political parties are banned; candidates must be independent.
 – Political parties are banned; candidates must be independent.
 – Political parties are banned.
 – Political parties are banned.
 – Political parties are banned.
 – Political parties are banned.

Republics

Territories

 

 Almost every municipal government in the country

 - Political parties exist and contest elections, however, none have ever won over an independent candidate.

 - The Nebraska Legislature is non-partisan

Former entities
 - Even though political parties were not banned the Confederate Congress did not have any political parties.
 Polish government-in-exile - There were no official political parties, but several unofficial political factions existed 
  Libyan Arab Jamahiriya

References

Political parties
Countries without political parties
Without